Year 1464 (MCDLXIV) was a leap year starting on Sunday (link will display the full calendar) of the Julian calendar. It is one of eight years (CE) to contain each Roman numeral once (1000(M)+(-100(C)+500(D))+50(L)+10(X)+(-1(I)+5(V)) = 1464).

Events 
 January–December 
 April 25 – Battle of Hedgeley Moor in England: Yorkist forces under John Neville defeat the Lancastrians under Sir Ralph Percy, who is killed.
 May 1 – Edward IV of England secretly marries Elizabeth Woodville, and keeps the marriage a secret for five months afterwards.
 May 15 – Battle of Hexham: Neville defeats another Lancastrian army, this one led by King Henry and Queen Margaret themselves. This marks the end of organized Lancastrian resistance for several years.
 June 11 – A 15-year-truce between the kingdoms of England and Scotland is signed.
 June 18 – Pope Pius II himself shoulders the cross of the Crusades, and departs for Ancona to participate in person. He names Skanderbeg general captain of the Holy See, under the title Athleta Christi. This plan forces Skanderbeg to break his ten-year peace treaty with the Ottomans signed in 1463, by attacking their forces near Ohrid.
 June 23 – Christian I of Denmark and Norway, who is also serving as King of Sweden, is declared deposed from the latter throne. His deposed predecessor Charles VIII of Sweden is re-elected to the throne on August 9.
 August 21 – Emperor Go-Hanazono of Japan abdicates, and is succeeded by his son, Emperor Go-Tsuchimikado.
 August 30 – Pope Paul II succeeds Pope Pius II, as the 211th pope.

 Date unknown 
 In China, a small rebellion occurs in the interior province of Huguang, during the Ming Dynasty; a subsequent rebellion springs up in Guangxi, where a rebellion of the Miao people and Yao people forces the Ming throne to respond, by sending 30,000 troops (including 1,000 Mongol cavalry) to aid the 160,000 local troops stationed in the region, to crush the rebellion that will end in 1466.
 Jehan Lagadeuc writes a Breton-French-Latin dictionary called the Catholicon. It is the first French dictionary as well as the first Breton dictionary of world history, and it will be published in 1499.
 Tenguella, the founder of the Empire of Great Fulo, becomes chief of the Fula people.

Births 
 April 23
 Robert Fayrfax, English Renaissance composer (d. 1521)
 Joan of France, Duchess of Berry (d. 1505)
 May 6 – Sophia Jagiellon, Margravine of Brandenburg-Ansbach, Polish princess (d. 1512)
 May 30 – Barbara of Brandenburg, Bohemian queen (d. 1515)
 June 27 – Ernst II of Saxony, Archbishop of Magdeburg (1476–1513) and Administrator of Halberstadt (1480–1513) (d. 1513)
 July 1 – Clara Gonzaga, Italian noble (d. 1503)
 November 19 – Emperor Go-Kashiwabara of Japan (d. 1526)
 date unknown
 Nezahualpilli, Aztec ruler (d. 1515)
 Philippe Villiers de L'Isle-Adam, Grand Master of the Knights Hospitallers (d. 1534)

Deaths 
 January – Desiderio da Settignano, Italian sculptor (b. c. 1428 or 1430)
 February 23 – Zhengtong Emperor of China (b. 1427)
 March 8 – Catherine of Poděbrady, Hungarian queen consort (b. 1449)
 May 15 – Henry Beaufort, 3rd Duke of Somerset (executed) (b. 1436)
 May 17 – Thomas de Ros, 9th Baron de Ros, English politician (executed) (b. 1427)
 May 25 – Charles I, Count of Nevers (b. 1414)
 June 18 – Rogier van der Weyden, Flemish painter (b. 1399 or 1400)
 August 1 – Cosimo de' Medici, ruler of Florence (b. 1389)
 August 11 – Nicholas of Cusa, German mathematician and astronomer (b. 1401)
 August 12 – John Capgrave, English historian and theologian (b. 1393)
 August 14 – Pope Pius II (b. 1405)
 September 7 – Otto III, Duke of Pomerania-Stettin (1460–1464) (b. 1444)
 September 23 – Bernardo Rossellino, Italian sculptor and architect (b. 1409)
 September 26 – Benedetto Accolti the Elder, Italian jurist and historian (b. 1415)
 November 16 – John, Margrave of Brandenburg-Kulmbach (b. 1406)
 November 23 – Blessed Margaret of Savoy (b. 1382 or 1390)
 December 2 – Blanche II of Navarre (b. 1424)
 date unknown – Fra Mauro, Venetian Camaldolese monk, cartographer and accountant (b. c. 1400)

References